Trifurcula albiflorella is a moth of the family Nepticulidae. It is found in Greece and Turkey.

The wingspan is 4.25–5 mm.

The larvae feed on Nepeta nuda albiflora. They mine the leaves of their host plant. The mine consists of a broad corridor, mostly along the leaf margin. The frass is deposited in a diffuse central line, leaving a broad transparent zone at either side.

External links
Beitrag zur Kenntnis der Nepticulidenfauna von Anatolien und der Insel Rhodos (Lepidoptera, Nepticulidae)
bladmineerders.nl

Nepticulidae
Moths of Europe
Moths of Asia
Moths described in 1978